The Butte-aux-Cailles (a name that could be translated into "quail hill", although it originates from its former landowner Pierre Caille, who bought a vineyard here in 1543) is a hilltop neighbourhood of Paris, France located in Paris' south-eastern 13th arrondissement. A now extinct river, the Bièvre (from Latin 'Beaver'), once made this area important for the tannery and tissue trades.

Today the Butte-aux-Cailles area assembles a young, trendy and festive Parisian population in its many small bars and restaurants. Since its incorporation into Paris along with the northern extremity of the now Paris-bordering Gentilly commune to which it belonged, the Butte-aux-Cailles has managed to retain much of its village ambiance.

References

Geography of Paris
13th arrondissement of Paris